HD 36041 is giant star in the northern constellation Auriga. It has an apparent magnitude of 6.37, making it faintly visible to the naked eye.

References

External links
 HR 1825
 CCDM J05307+ 3950
 Image HD 36041

Auriga (constellation)
036041
025810
G-type giants
1825
Durchmusterung objects